The golden-fronted greenlet (Pachysylvia aurantiifrons) is a small passerine bird in the vireo family. It breeds in  Panama, Colombia, Venezuela and Trinidad.

It is a bird of forests and secondary growth which builds a deep cup nest suspended from a tree branch or vine. The typical clutch is three white eggs, which are marked with brown.  This species is parasitised by the shiny cowbird.

The adult golden-fronted greenlet is 12 cm long and weighs 9.5 g. It is mainly green on the upperparts, with browner wings and tail, and a cinnamon tinge to the front and sides of the head. The underparts are yellow. The call is a chee-veee.

Golden-fronted greenlets feed on insects and spiders taken from the upper and middle levels of tree foliage. They often form small flocks.

References 

golden-fronted greenlet
Birds of Panama
Birds of Colombia
Birds of Venezuela
Birds of Trinidad and Tobago
golden-fronted greenlet
golden-fronted greenlet